Presidential elections were held in South Ossetia in 2001. As no candidate received a majority of the vote in the first round on 18 November, a second round was held on 6 December, which was won by Eduard Kokoity, who defeated Stanislav Kochiev. Incumbent president Lyudvig Chibirov was eliminated in the first round mostly due to popular disdain in his economic policies. The elections were boycotted by the Georgian population.

Electoral system
The election was held using the two-round system; meaning that a candidate would only be declared a winner if they received over 50% of the vote in the first round. If not a second round between the top two candidates will be held as a runoff election.

Candidates
The three candidates were:
Lyudvig Chibirov, incumbent president since 1996, and the former Chairman of the Presidium of the South Ossetian Supreme Council from 1993-1996
Stanislav Kochiev, Former head of the ideological division of the South Ossetian regional branch of the Communist Party of the Soviet Union, leader of the  Committee on National Affairs and the Ministry of Information and Press since 1991, Speaker of the South Ossetian Parliament, and First Secretary of the Communist Party of South Ossetia since 1994.
Eduard Kokoity, Former Soviet wrestling champion, First Secretary of the Tskhinvali branch of the Komsomol until 1989, and a Moscow based businessmen from 1992-2001.

Results
The first round of the election was held on 19 November saw Kokoity receive 48% of the vote, followed by Kochiev with 25% and Chibirov in third with less than 20%. As no candidate received more than 50% of the vote, a runoff election was held on 6 December. The second round of the election saw a surge of votes for Kochiev and the Communist Party, bringing their share up from 25% to 42.5%. However, this was not enough to cross the 50% threshold and the frontrunner Kokoity was elected with 57.5% of the vote.

Aftermath
Following his victory Kokoity assumed office on 18 December 2001.

References

Presidential elections in South Ossetia
2001 in Georgia (country)
South Ossetia
South Ossetia
Presidential election
Election and referendum articles with incomplete results